Juan Carlos Moscoso Palma (born May 6, 1982) is a former Salvadoran professional footballer who played mainly as a defender.

Club career
A one-club man, Moscoso has come through the youth categories at FAS and played for the reserves before making his professional debut in July 2004 against Once Municipal.

With FAS Moscoso he had a very successful period, winning two national league titles: Clausura 2005 and Apertura 2009, in this last tournament Moscoso was the hero of the final when he scored important goal in the minute 97 against Águila in a 3–2 victory.

However, with FAS he also lost the finals of the Clausura 2006, Apertura 2006, Apertura 2007, Clausura 2008, Clausura 2011, Clausura 2013 and Apertura 2013.

In 2015, however, Moscoso signed for UES. With UES Moscoso had a very irregular performance in the two seasons that he spent with the team. The situation of UES, which was in danger of descent and with administrative problems, did not help either.

In 2017 Moscoso returned to sign for FAS. At the end of the same year, Moscoso received a tribute from the club in the Estadio Óscar Quiteño, recognizing his loyalty and his time of stay with the club of Santa Ana, prior to a game against Santa Tecla.

International career
Moscoso made his debut for El Salvador in an October 2006 friendly match against Panama and has, as of January 2012, earned a total of 10 caps, scoring 1 goal.

He has represented his country in one FIFA World Cup qualification match.

International goals

References

1982 births
Living people
People from Santa Ana Department
Association football midfielders
Salvadoran footballers
El Salvador international footballers
C.D. FAS footballers